Queercore: How to Punk a Revolution is a 2017 English-language German documentary film directed by Yony Leyser about the social and cultural movement known as Queercore.  The documentary focuses on the movement's diverse elements, including zine culture, music, film, and activism.

Release

The film debuted at the Sheffield Doc/Fest on June 12, 2017 and was acquired for distribution in Europe by Edition Salzgeber.  It was also acquired for television by Arte in France and by ZDF in Germany.

It was announced on February 9, 2018 that all U.S. rights for the film had been acquired by distributor Altered Innocence, with a U.S. theatrical release planned for late 2018.  The film premiered theatrically on September 23, 2018 and was released on DVD, Blu-ray and VOD on January 8, 2019.

References

External links

2017 films
2017 documentary films
German documentary films
German LGBT-related films
2017 LGBT-related films
Documentary films about LGBT topics
Queercore
2010s English-language films
2010s German films